Acrocercops astiopa is a moth of the family Gracillariidae, known from Bihar, India. The hostplant for the species is Polyalthia longifolia.

References

astiopa
Moths of Asia
Moths described in 1930